Seonyudo is an island in Okdo-myeon, Gunsan, South Korea.

Islands of North Jeolla Province
Gunsan